Leonda was a community, now extinct, in Pipe Creek Township, Miami County, in the U.S. state of Indiana.

History
Leonda was laid out in 1851 by Jacob Pottarff and Harvey Hoover. In its heyday, the town had a post office, a general store, and a hotel. When the Pan Handle Railroad was built in Miami County, it was not extended to Leonda, being built through nearby Bunker Hill instead. This led to Leonda becoming a ghost town.

A post office was established at Leonda in 1852, and remained in operation until it was discontinued in 1860.

References

External links
 

Geography of Miami County, Indiana
Ghost towns in Indiana